VolkerWessels Cycling Team is a UCI Continental road bicycle racing team established in 2016 in the Netherlands. The team was promoted to the UCI Continental level in 2019. The team's main sponsor is VolkerWessels, a Dutch construction company.

Team roster

Major results
2021
 Stage 2 Course de Solidarność et des Champions Olympiques, Nick Brabander
 Okolo jižních Čech
Stage 1 (TTT)
Stage 3, Nick van der Meer
 Ster van Zwolle, Coen Vermeltfoort
2022
 Dorpenomloop Rucphen, Maikel Zijlaard
 Overall  Olympia's Tour, Maikel Zijlaard
Stage 2 Peter Schulting
 Stage 7 Tour de Normandie, Coen Vermeltfoort
 Stage 4 Tour du Loir-et-Cher, Coen Vermeltfoort
 PWZ Zuidenveld Tour, Coen Vermeltfoort
 Ronde van Overijssel, Coen Vermeltfoort
 Stage 1 Flèche du Sud, Daan van Sintmaartensdijk
  National U23 Road Race Championships, Max Kroonen
 Stage 1a Course de Solidarność et des Champions Olympiques, Coen Vermeltfoort
 2 Districtenpijl-Ekeren-Deurne, Coen Vermeltfoort
 Stage 4 Kreiz Breizh Elites, Bart Lemmen
 Ronde van de Achterhoek, Coen Vermeltfoort
 Stages 2 & 3 Okolo jižních Čech, Maikel Zijlaard
 Stage 4 Okolo Slovenska, Jasper Haest
 Grote Prijs Rik Van Looy, Coen Vermeltfoort

Notes

References

External links 
 

Cycling teams established in 2016
UCI Continental Teams (Europe)
Cycling teams based in the Netherlands